Awaken is a 2020–2021 South Korean television series starring Namkoong Min, Kim Seol-hyun, Lee Chung-ah and Kim Chang-wan. The series, directed by Kim Jung-hyun and written by Shin Yoo-dam, revolves around two police officers as they dig up the secrets of mysterious events that occurred in a village 28 years ago.

It aired on tvN from November 30, 2020, to January 19, 2021, every Monday and Tuesday at 21:00 (KST).

Synopsis

Do Jung-woo, the leader of a special task force in the Seoul Metropolitan Police Agency, ends up investigating a series of mysterious murders. Together with his team, which includes hot-headed Officer Gong Hye-won and Jamie, a detective on loan from the FBI, they uncover clues that these crimes are somehow related to a tragic event that happened 28 years ago in a village called "White Night".

Cast

Main
 Namkoong Min as Do Jung-woo
  as young Jung-woo
 A special team leader of the Seoul Metropolitan Police Agency who is capable of writing a legend.
 Kim Seol-hyun as Gong Hye-won
 An avid police officer who does not choose any means and methods, and a special team inspector at the Seoul Metropolitan Police Agency.
 Lee Chung-ah as Jamie Leighton
  as young Jamie
 Adopted to the United States as a child, she is an FBI-dispatched investigator who returned to Korea as the FBI Behavior Analysis Team Leader.
Yoon Sun-woo as Moon Jae-woong
  as young Jae-woong
 A hacker from MODU with dissociative identity disorder. He has two personalities: a weak personality and a psychopath.

Supporting

People around Do Jung-woo 
 Woo Hyun as Jung Soon-gu
 CEO of Soonjung LP. He is a widower who took care of Jung-woo and helped him to live under a different name.
 Jung Dae-ro as Baek Hyun-soo

People around Gong Hye-won 
 Kim Chang-wan as Gong Il-do
 Gong Hye-won's father who is the Director of Baekya Biotech Research Institute
  as Gong Hye-won's mother

People around Moon Jae-woong 
 Jang Hyuk-jin as Jang Yong-shik, CEO of MODU

Broadcasting Station 
 Yoon Kyung-ho as Lee Ji-wook
  as Noh PD

Seoul Metropolitan Police Agency 
 Kim Won-hae as Hwang Byeong-cheol
 Deputy Chief of Seoul Metropolitan Police Agency 
 Baek Ji-won as Lee Taek-jo
 Director of Information Management in the Seoul Metropolitan Police Agency.
 Choi Dae-chul as Yoon Seok-pil
 A detective in the Seoul Metropolitan Police Agency Special Team who is a competent hacker.
 Lee Shin-young as Jang Ji-wan
 A member of the Seoul Metropolitan Police Agency Special Team.
 Kang Rae-yeon as Min Yoo-ra
 A pathologist from the National Forensic Service who performs autopsies.

Baekya Foundation 
 Kim Tae-woo as Oh Jung-hwan
 Chief secretary of the current president
  as Kim Min-jae
 Choi Jin-ho as Son Min-ho
 Former leader of White Night
 Ahn Si-ha as Jo Hyun-hee
 A scientist working for Baekya Foundation, former Head of Research of White Night
 Lee Kan-hee
Baekya Foundation Director and wife of Lee Byeong-seon, Director of Hangang Hospital in Seoul, mother of Lee Tae-soo

Others 
  as Sun Geul-nyeo
 Reporter Lee Ji-wook's source of information.
  as Son Min-ho's private lawyer

Special appearances 
 Heo Jae-ho as truck driver (Ep. 1)
Nam Woo-hyun as Oh Kyung-min (Ep. 1)
Kwak Hee-joo as Kim Young-joon (Ep. 1)
Kim Nam-jin as Go Ji-young's mother (Ep. 1)
Lee Joon-sang as Baek Seung-jae (Ep. 1)
Shin Jae-hwi as Lee Tae-soo; nightclub guy (Ep. 1 - 10)
Joo Suk-tae as Choi Yong-suk (Ep. 1)
Yang Dong-geun as prisoner (Ep. 1)
Ha Min as Choi Yong-suk's wife (Ep. 2)
Jaejae as Restaurant staff

Production
In December 2019, 935 Entertainment, Namkoong Min's agency reported that he had received the offer to play Do Jeong-woo, an investigator. At the same time, Han Ye-seul's agency Partners Park informed that she had been offered to appear in the series. Both confirmed their appearance in the series later on. In March 2020, Lee Chung-ah joined Namkoong Min in the cast. The script reading took place in April 2020. Yoon Kyung-ho joined the cast in June 2020. In August 2020, the filming of the drama was stopped due to the COVID-19 pandemic. In October 2020, Baek Ji-won and Lee Shin-young were confirmed to appear in the series, as the script reading was continued from where it was left in August. The first stills from the production were released on November 3, 2020.

Original soundtrack

Part 1

Part 2

Part 3

Viewership

International broadcast
The series is available with multi-languages subtitles on iQIYI and VIU in South East Asia.
 : TV3 (Coming Soon 2022)

References

External links
  
 
 

TVN (South Korean TV channel) television dramas
2020 South Korean television series debuts
Korean-language television shows
South Korean romantic drama films
South Korean mystery television series
Television productions postponed due to the COVID-19 pandemic
Television series by Kim Jong-hak Production
2021 South Korean television series endings